In accounting and finance, earnings before interest and taxes (EBIT) is a measure of a firm's profit that includes all incomes and expenses (operating and non-operating) except interest expenses and income tax expenses.

Operating income and operating profit are sometimes used as a synonym for EBIT when a firm does not have non-operating income and non-operating expenses.

Formula 
EBIT = (net income) + interest + taxes = EBITDA – (depreciation and amortization expenses)
operating income = (gross income) – OPEX = EBIT – (non-operating profit) + (non-operating expenses)
where
EBITDA = earnings before interest, taxes, depreciation, and amortization
OPEX = operating expense

Overview 
A professional investor contemplating a change to the capital structure of a firm (e.g., through a leveraged buyout) first evaluates a firm's fundamental earnings potential (reflected by earnings before interest, taxes, depreciation and amortization (EBITDA) and EBIT), and then determines the optimal use of debt versus equity (equity value).

To calculate EBIT, expenses (e.g. the cost of goods sold, selling and administrative expenses) are subtracted from revenues. Net income is later obtained by subtracting interest and taxes from the result.

Earnings before taxes 
Earnings before taxes (EBT) is the money retained by the firm before deducting the money to be paid for taxes. EBT excludes the money paid for interest. Thus, it can be calculated by subtracting the interest from EBIT (earnings before interest and taxes).

See also 
 Earnings before interest, taxes, and amortization (EBITA)
 Earnings before interest, taxes, and depreciation (EBITD)
 Earnings before interest, taxes, depreciation, amortization, and restructuring or rent costs (EBITDAR)
 Earnings before interest, taxes, depreciation, and amortization (EBITDA)
 EV/EBITDA
 Operating income before depreciation and amortization (OIBDA)

References

Fundamental analysis
Profit